The 4th Critics' Choice Movie Awards were presented on January 25, 1999, honoring the finest achievements of 1998 filmmaking.

Top 10 films
(in alphabetical order)

 Elizabeth
 Gods and Monsters
 Life Is Beautiful (La vita è bella)
 Out of Sight
 Pleasantville
 Saving Private Ryan
 Shakespeare in Love
 A Simple Plan
 The Thin Red Line
 The Truman Show

Winners

 Best Actor:
 Ian McKellen – Gods and Monsters and Apt Pupil
 Best Actress:
 Cate Blanchett – Elizabeth
 Best Animated Feature:
 A Bug's Life / The Prince of Egypt (TIE)
 Best Child Performer:
 Ian Michael Smith – Simon Birch
 Best Director:
 Steven Spielberg – Saving Private Ryan
 Best Family Film:
 A Bug's Life
 Best Feature Documentary:
 Wild Man Blues
 Best Foreign Language Film:
 Life Is Beautiful (La vita è bella) • Italy
 Best Picture:
 Saving Private Ryan
 Best Picture Made for Television:
 From the Earth to the Moon
 Best Score:
 John Williams – Saving Private Ryan
 Best Screenplay – Adaptation:
 A Simple Plan – Scott B. Smith
 Best Screenplay – Original:
 Shakespeare in Love – Tom Stoppard and Marc Norman
 Best Song:
 "When You Believe" – The Prince of Egypt
 Best Supporting Actor:
 Billy Bob Thornton – A Simple Plan
 Best Supporting Actress:
 Joan Allen – Pleasantville / Kathy Bates – Primary Colors (TIE)
 Breakthrough Performer:
 Joseph Fiennes – Elizabeth and Shakespeare in Love
 Alan J. Pakula Award (for artistic excellence while illuminating issues of great social and political importance):
 John Travolta

References

Broadcast Film Critics Association Awards
1998 film awards